The 4th constituency of the Puy-de-Dôme (French: Quatrième circonscription du Puy-de-Dôme) is a French legislative constituency in the Puy-de-Dôme département. Like the other 576 French constituencies, it elects one MP using a two-round electoral system.

Description

The 4th constituency of the Puy-de-Dôme is in the south of the department to the south of Clermont-Ferrand, the south east portion of which is contained within it.

The seat has historically lent towards the left with only a sole RPR victory in 1993 to interrupt the dominance of the Socialist Party. However, in 2017 the constituency followed the national trend by electing a centrist deputy from Emmanuel Macron's coalition.

Assembly Members

Election results

2022

 
 
|-
| colspan="8" bgcolor="#E9E9E9"|
|-
 
 

 
 
 
 
 
* Pradier ran as a dissident member of MoDem, without the support of the party or the Ensemble Citoyens alliance.

2017

|- style="background-color:#E9E9E9;text-align:center;"
! colspan="2" rowspan="2" style="text-align:left;" | Candidate
! rowspan="2" colspan="2" style="text-align:left;" | Party
! colspan="2" | 1st round
! colspan="2" | 2nd round
|- style="background-color:#E9E9E9;text-align:center;"
! width="75" | Votes
! width="30" | %
! width="75" | Votes
! width="30" | %
|-
| style="background-color:" |
| style="text-align:left;" | Michel Fanget
| style="text-align:left;" | Democratic Movement
| MoDem
| 
| 32.92
| 
| 55.44
|-
| style="background-color:" |
| style="text-align:left;" | Bertrand Barraud
| style="text-align:left;" | The Republicans
| LR
| 
| 14.72
| 
| 44.56
|-
| style="background-color:" |
| style="text-align:left;" | Catherine Mollet
| style="text-align:left;" | La France Insoumise
| FI
| 
| 14.47
| colspan="2" style="text-align:left;" |
|-
| style="background-color:" |
| style="text-align:left;" | Sylvie Maisonnet
| style="text-align:left;" | Socialist Party
| PS
| 
| 9.65
| colspan="2" style="text-align:left;" |
|-
| style="background-color:" |
| style="text-align:left;" | Sylwia Powarunas
| style="text-align:left;" | National Front
| FN
| 
| 8.58
| colspan="2" style="text-align:left;" |
|-
| style="background-color:" |
| style="text-align:left;" | Hervé Prononce
| style="text-align:left;" | Union of Democrats and Independents
| UDI
| 
| 6.70
| colspan="2" style="text-align:left;" |
|-
| style="background-color:" |
| style="text-align:left;" | Catherine Fromage
| style="text-align:left;" | Communist Party
| PCF
| 
| 4.66
| colspan="2" style="text-align:left;" |
|-
| style="background-color:" |
| style="text-align:left;" | Jean-Baptiste Pegeon
| style="text-align:left;" | Ecologist
| ECO
| 
| 4.31
| colspan="2" style="text-align:left;" |
|-
| style="background-color:" |
| style="text-align:left;" | Maximilien Martins
| style="text-align:left;" | Debout la France
| DLF
| 
| 1.26
| colspan="2" style="text-align:left;" |
|-
| style="background-color:" |
| style="text-align:left;" | Nicole Lozano
| style="text-align:left;" | Miscellaneous Left
| DVG
| 
| 0.95
| colspan="2" style="text-align:left;" |
|-
| style="background-color:" |
| style="text-align:left;" | François Marotte
| style="text-align:left;" | Far Left
| EXG
| 
| 0.63
| colspan="2" style="text-align:left;" |
|-
| style="background-color:" |
| style="text-align:left;" | Roland Domas
| style="text-align:left;" | Miscellaneous Right
| DVD
| 
| 0.62
| colspan="2" style="text-align:left;" |
|-
| style="background-color:" |
| style="text-align:left;" | Mathias Masclet
| style="text-align:left;" | Independent
| DIV
| 
| 0.53
| colspan="2" style="text-align:left;" |
|-
| style="background-color:" |
| style="text-align:left;" | Dominique Morel
| style="text-align:left;" | Far Right
| EXD
| 
| 0.01
| colspan="2" style="text-align:left;" |
|-
| colspan="8" style="background-color:#E9E9E9;"|
|- style="font-weight:bold"
| colspan="4" style="text-align:left;" | Total
| 
| 100%
| 
| 100%
|-
| colspan="8" style="background-color:#E9E9E9;"|
|-
| colspan="4" style="text-align:left;" | Registered voters
| 
| style="background-color:#E9E9E9;"|
| 
| style="background-color:#E9E9E9;"|
|-
| colspan="4" style="text-align:left;" | Blank/Void ballots
| 
| 1.15%
| 
| 7.29%
|-
| colspan="4" style="text-align:left;" | Turnout
| 
| 51.87%
| 
| 42.51%
|-
| colspan="4" style="text-align:left;" | Abstentions
| 
| 48.13%
| 
| 57.49%
|-
| colspan="8" style="background-color:#E9E9E9;"|
|- style="font-weight:bold"
| colspan="6" style="text-align:left;" | Result
| colspan="2" style="background-color:" | MoDem GAIN FROM PS
|}

2012
Jean-Paul Bacquet, the Socialist Party candidate, was elected with over 50% of the vote in the first round, thus meaning that no second round run-off took place.

|- style="background-color:#E9E9E9;text-align:center;"
! colspan="2" rowspan="2" style="text-align:left;" | Candidate
! rowspan="2" colspan="2" style="text-align:left;" | Party
! colspan="2" | 1st round
|- style="background-color:#E9E9E9;text-align:center;"
! width="75" | Votes
! width="30" | %
|-
| style="background-color:" |
| style="text-align:left;" | Jean-Paul Bacquet
| style="text-align:left;" | Socialist Party
| PS
| 
| 50.91
|-
| style="background-color:" |
| style="text-align:left;" | Bertrand Barraud
| style="text-align:left;" | The Republicans
| UMP
| 
| 21.27
|-
| style="background-color:" |
| style="text-align:left;" | Dominique Morel
| style="text-align:left;" | National Front
| FN
| 
| 10.41
|-
| style="background-color:" |
| style="text-align:left;" | Eléonor Perise
| style="text-align:left;" | Left Front
| FG
| 
| 7.77
|-
| style="background-color:" |
| style="text-align:left;" | Hélène Fourvel-Pelletier
| style="text-align:left;" | Europe Ecology – The Greens
| EELV
| 
| 3.24
|-
| style="background-color:" |
| style="text-align:left;" | Valérie Coudun
| style="text-align:left;" | Independent Centrist
| CEN
| 
| 2.45
|-
| style="background-color:" |
| style="text-align:left;" | Cécile Besnard
| style="text-align:left;" | New Centre
| NC
| 
| 0.88
|-
| style="background-color:" |
| style="text-align:left;" | Alexandre Seytre
| style="text-align:left;" | Ecologist
| ECO
| 
| 0.81
|-
| style="background-color:" |
| style="text-align:left;" | Patrick Goyeau
| style="text-align:left;" | Far Left
| EXG
| 
| 0.77
|-
| style="background-color:" |
| style="text-align:left;" | Pierre Fortier
| style="text-align:left;" | Ecologist
| ECO
| 
| 0.53
|-
| style="background-color:" |
| style="text-align:left;" | Nathalie Courageot
| style="text-align:left;" | Far Left
| EXG
| 
| 0.52
|-
| style="background-color:" |
| style="text-align:left;" | Alexandrine Salazar
| style="text-align:left;" | Far Left
| EXG
| 
| 0.45
|-
| colspan="8" style="background-color:#E9E9E9;"|
|- style="font-weight:bold"
| colspan="4" style="text-align:left;" | Total
| 
| 100%
|-
| colspan="8" style="background-color:#E9E9E9;"|
|-
| colspan="4" style="text-align:left;" | Registered voters
| 
| style="background-color:#E9E9E9;"|
|-
| colspan="4" style="text-align:left;" | Blank/Void ballots
| 
| 1.48%
|-
| colspan="4" style="text-align:left;" | Turnout
| 
| 59.20%
|-
| colspan="4" style="text-align:left;" | Abstentions
| 
| 40.80%
|-
| colspan="8" style="background-color:#E9E9E9;"|
|- style="font-weight:bold"
| colspan="4" style="text-align:left;" | Result
| colspan="2" style="background-color:" | PS HOLD
|}

References

4